Raymond Paul Legrand (May 23, 1908 in Paris – November 25, 1974 in Montreal) was a French composer and conductor.

Career

Legrand studied harmony and orchestration as a pupil of Gabriel Faure. In the realms of jazz and light music, he made arrangements for Ray Ventura and his ensemble from 1934, before assembling his own group under the Occupation. He surrounded himself with former musicians met while with Ventura, especially Henri Bourtayre (composition) and Guy Dejardin (arrangement, orchestration). During the Second world war, he participated in the Collaboration with the Vichy government.

Raymond Legrand's orchestra included Irène de Trébert, Maurice Chevalier, Georges Guétary, Tino Rossi, and Colette Renard. He also collaborated with figures of French song like Francis Lemarque, Mouloudji, Édith Piaf and Henri Salvador.

In 1948, he directed the orchestra for the recording of C'est si bon by Les Soeurs Étienne, which became a hit. In 1966, his son Michel Legrand directed the orchestra for the version of this song by Barbra Streisand on the album Color Me Barbra.

He also composed copiously for film.

Personal life

Legrand married Marcelle Der Mikaëlian (sister of Jacques Hélian) in 1929; their children were the singer Christiane Legrand, born in 1930 and the composer Michel Legrand, born in 1932. By 1935, he abandoned his wife and children. In 1943, he had a son, Michel-Patrick Legrand with the singer Irène de Trebert. 

In 1946, he divorced, and several years later married Paulette Bonimond; they had two children, the writer Benjamin Legrand and the painter Olivier Legrand. In 1960, he and Paulette divorced, and he married Colette Renard. In 1971, he divorced again to marry Martine Leroy, with whom he had a daughter, Coralie Legrand.

Film soundtracks
Grisou, Maurice de Canonge (1938)
Le Roman de Renard, Ladislas Starewitch and Irène Starewitch (1941)
Mademoiselle Swing, Richard Pottier (1942)
Destins, Richard Pottier (1946)
L'aventure commence demain, Richard Pottier (1948)
 Two Loves, Richard Pottier (1949)
Justice est faite, André Cayatte (1950)
Meurtres?, Richard Pottier (1950)
 Alone in Paris, Hervé Bromberger (1951)
 Topaze, Marcel Pagnol (1951)
Manon des sources, Marcel Pagnol (1952)
Nous sommes tous des assassins, André Cayatte (1952)
Paris chante toujours, Pierre Montazel (1952)
Une fille dans le soleil, Maurice Cam (1953)
Les Compagnes de la nuit, Ralph Habib (1953)
Carnaval, Henri Verneuil (1953)
Le Boulanger de Valorgue, Henri Verneuil (1953)
Ce soir les jupons volent, Dimitri Kirsanoff (1956)
Business, Maurice Boutel (1960)
Clodo, Georges Clair (1975)

Sources
 Chantal Brunschwig, Louis-Jean Calvet, Jean-Claude Klein, Cent ans de chanson française, Seuil, 1972 
 Jacques Hélian, Les Grands orchestres de music-hall en France : souvenirs et témoignages, Filipacchi, 1984 
 Jean Jour, Roger Darton : pince-moi, je rêve !, Éditions Dricot, 1993 

1908 births
1974 deaths
French composers
Musicians from Paris
French male conductors (music)
20th-century French conductors (music)
20th-century French male musicians
French collaborators with Nazi Germany
French emigrants to Canada